The 2022–23 Southern Football League season is the 120th in the history of the Southern League since its establishment in 1894. The league has two Premier divisions (Central and South) at Step 3 of the National League System (NLS) and two Division One divisions (Central and South) at Step 4. These correspond to levels 7 and 8 of the English football league system. 

The allocations for Step 4 this season were announced by The Football Association (FA) on 12 May 2022.

Premier Division Central

Premier Division Central comprises 22 teams, one more than the set of 21 which competed in the previous season.

Team changes

To the Premier League Central
Promoted from the Division One Central
Bedford Town

Promoted from the Northern Premier League Division One Midlands
Ilkeston Town

Transferred from the Northern Premier League Premier Division
Basford United
Mickleover

Transferred from the Premier Division South
Kings Langley

From the Premier Division Central
Promoted to the National League North
Banbury United
Peterborough Sports

Relegated to Division One Central
Biggleswade Town

Relegated to the Isthmian League North Division
Lowestoft Town

Premier Division Central table
Prior to the first match(es) being played the Pos column shows alphabetic sequence of teams rather than league position.

Results

Stadia and locations

Premier Division South

Premier Division South comprises 22 teams, 17 of which competed in the previous season.

Team changes

To the Premier Division South
Promoted from Division One Central
North Leigh

Promoted from Division One South
Plymouth Parkway
Winchester City

Promoted from the Isthmian League South Central Division
Bracknell Town
Hanwell Town

From the Premier Division South
Promoted to the National League South
Farnborough
Taunton Town

Relegated to Division One South
Wimborne Town

Club folded
Walton Casuals

Transferred back to the Premier Division Central
Kings Langley

Premier Division South table
Prior to the first match(es) being played the Pos column shows alphabetic sequence of teams rather than league position.

Results

Stadium and locations

Division One Central

Division One Central comprises 20 teams, 15 of which competed in the previous season.

Team changes

To Division One Central
Promoted from the Essex Senior League
Walthamstow

Promoted from the Spartan South Midlands League Premier Division
Hadley

Relegated from the Premier Division Central
Biggleswade Town

Transferred from Division One South
Cirencester Town
Highworth Town

From Division One Central
Promoted to the Premier Division Central
Bedford Town

Promoted to the Premier Division South
North Leigh

Relegated to the Hellenic League Premier Division
Wantage Town

Relegated to the Spartan South Midlands League Premier Division
Colney Heath

Transferred to the Northern Premier League Division One Midlands
St Neots Town

Division One Central league table
Prior to the first match(es) being played the Pos column shows alphabetic sequence of teams rather than league position.

Results

Stadia and locations

Division One South

Division One South comprises 20 teams, 12 of which competed in the previous season.

Team changes

To Division One South
Promoted from the Hellenic League Premier Division
Bishop's Cleeve
Westbury United

Promoted from the Wessex League Premier Division
Bashley
Hamworthy United

Promoted from the Western League Premier Division
Exmouth Town
Tavistock

Relegated from the Premier Division South
Wimborne Town

From Division One South
Promoted to the Premier Division South
Plymouth Parkway
Winchester City

Relegated to the Hellenic League Premier Division
Mangotsfield United

Relegated to the Western League Premier Division
Barnstaple Town

Transferred to Division One Central
Cirencester Town
Highworth Town

Division One South league table
Prior to the first match(es) being played the Pos column shows alphabetic sequence of teams rather than league position.

Results

Stadia and locations

League Cup
The 2022–23 Southern League Cup will be the 8X edition of the Southern League Cup, the cup competition of the Southern Football League if it held.

See also
 Southern Football League
 2022–23 Isthmian League
 2022–23 Northern Premier League

References

External links
Official website

Southern Football League seasons
7
Football in England
s